A fire basket is an iron basket in which wood can be burned to make a bonfire.

Background
During the Middle Ages fire baskets filled with sulfur were used to repel the Black Death. Currently the fire basket is used for enjoyment. In some countries the fire basket is used during Christmas in a Christmas pageant.

Gallery

See also
 brazier

External links

References

Light fixtures
Garden features
Fireplaces
Cooking vessels